Janet Donald (c.1825–27 March 1892) was a New Zealand church leader. She was born in Wigtownshire, Scotland on c.1825.

References

1825 births
1892 deaths
Scottish emigrants to New Zealand
New Zealand Baptists
19th-century New Zealand people
19th-century Baptists